is a Japanese actress and voice actress affiliated with StarCrew. She has also performed activities as a singer under the name of MIRI.

Filmography

TV anime

Original video animation
To Love Ru – Golden Darkness
To Love Ru Darkness – Golden Darkness
Mobile Suit Gundam: The Origin – Fraw Bow

Theatrical animation

TV Drama 

Kikai Sentai Zenkaiger (2021) – Secchan

Video games
Street Fighter IV – Sakura Kasugano
Star Ocean: The Last Hope – Reimi Saionji
Tokimeki Memorial 4 – Miyako Okura
Super Street Fighter IV – Sakura Kasugano
Super Street Fighter IV: Arcade Edition – Sakura Kasugano
Super Street Fighter IV: 3D Edition – Sakura Kasugano
Your Diary – Natsuki Fujimura
Street Fighter X Tekken – Sakura Kasugano
Granblue Fantasy – Carmelina
Ultra Street Fighter IV – Sakura Kasugano
Oreshika: Tainted Bloodlines – Kochin
Ao no Kanata no Four Rhythm – Asuka Kurashina
Tales of Zestiria – Edna
Return to PopoloCrois: A Story of Seasons Fairytale – Mayuri
Fate/Grand Order – Osakabehime
Closers – Tina
JoJo's Bizarre Adventure: Eyes of Heaven – Iggy
Street Fighter V – Sakura Kasugano
Azur Lane – Ibuki
Persona Q2: New Cinema Labyrinth – Hikari
Arknights (2019) – GreyThroat
Guardian Tales (2020) – Phantom Thief Lucy
Blue Archive – Iroha Natsume
Fist of the North Star Legends ReVIVE – Sakura Kasugano
Counter:Side (2021) -  Watanabe Yuko(Lee Yoonjung)
Honkai Impact 3rd – Li Sushang
JoJo's Bizarre Adventure: All Star Battle R – Iggy

Dubbing

Live-action
The Dukes of Hazzard – Katie-Lynn Johnson
Hawaii Five-0 – Kelly Donovon
iCarly – Freddie Benson (episodes 1–25; replaced by Yusuke Tezuka)
Never Said Goodbye – Xiao You (Zhou Dongyu)
The Nutcracker in 3D – Mary
Orphan Black – Sarah Manning
Real – Song Yoo-hwa (Sulli)
San Andreas – Ollie Taylor
Stuck in the Suburbs – Kaylee Holland
Trash – Rat (Gabriel Weinstein)

Animation
Adventure Time – Bandit Princess
Angelina Ballerina – Angelina Jeanette Mouseling
Baby Looney Tunes – Baby Petunia
Danger & Eggs – D.D. Danger
Guess with Jess - Billie 
The Looney Tunes Show – Gossamer
Meg and Mog – Mog
The World of Happy Planet - Springy, Savannah
Star Wars: Ewoks - Malani

References

External links
 
Misato Fukuen at StarCrew 
Misato Fukuen at Sigma Seven 
Misato Fukuen at the Seiyuu database
Misato Fukuen at GamePlaza-Haruka Voice Acting Database 
Misato Fukuen at Hitoshi Doi's Seiyuu Database

1982 births
Living people
Voice actresses from Tokyo
Japanese voice actresses
Japanese video game actresses
20th-century Japanese actresses
21st-century Japanese actresses
Sigma Seven voice actors